The 2016–17 Cape Town City season was the club's first season after their re-formation. They participated in the ABSA Premiership, finishing third, reached the semifinals of the MTN 8 and became champions of the Telkom Knockout.

Season review

Squad

Transfers

In

Out

Loans in

Loans out

Released

Trial

Friendlies

Competitions

Premier Division

Results by round

Results

League table

MTN 8

Telkom Knockout

Nedbank Cup

Squad statistics

Appearances and goals

|-
|colspan="14"|Players away from the club on loan:

|-
|colspan="14"|Players who appeared for Cape Town City but left during the season:

|}

Goal scorers

Disciplinary record

References

Cape Town City F.C. seasons
Cape Town City